Bathypolypus valdiviae, common name the boxer octopus or Valdivia bathyal octopus,  is a species of octopus in the Bathypolypodidae family. It is endemic to the south Atlantic off southern Africa below a depth of 500m where it was one of the most commonly sampled cephalopods, taken mainly from the sea bed. The specific name commemorates the SS Valdivia the steamship used on the Valdivia Expedition of 1898-1899 and which was led by Carl Chun.

In a recent 2021 study, geographic distribution of the species has expanded to waters off Guinea–Bissau.

References

Luna A, Rocha F, PeralesRaya C (2021). A review of cephalopods (Phylum: Mollusca) of the Canary Current Large Marine Ecosystem (Central-East Atlantic, African coast). Journal of the Marine Biological Association of the United Kingdom 101, 1–25. https://doi.org/10.1017/S0025315420001356

Octopodidae
Molluscs described in 1915